Campaign for National Parks (CNP) – formerly the Council for National Parks and the Standing Committee on National Parks – is a UK registered charity promoting the National Parks of England and Wales.

Their vision is: National Parks are beautiful and inspirational places enjoyed and valued by all.

Their mission is: To inspire everyone to enjoy and look after National Parks.

Campaign for National Parks is an umbrella body of around 30 environment and amenity groups, indirectly representing over 3 million people with an interest in National Parks.

History
In 1936 a group of individuals and voluntary organisations met for the first time to start a campaign for the establishment of National Parks in Britain. The Standing Committee on National Parks set out an ambitious agenda, that everyone should have the opportunity to enjoy the finest countryside, and that these landscapes should be protected permanently.

Following government legislation for National Parks in 1949, the role of the Standing Committee changed.  It concentrated on strengthening the powers and funding of National Parks, and being vigilant in monitoring proposals which would undermine their natural beauty and enjoyment.  In 1977 it became the Council for National Parks, and in June 2008 changed to its current name.

Presidents and Vice Presidents 
The President of the Campaign for National Parks is the actress, Caroline Quentin.

The Campaign has a number of distinguished Vice-Presidents: Viscount Addison, Baroness Andrews, Lord Bridges, Sara Edwards, Baroness Hamwee, Lord Inglewood, Lord Judd, Angus Lunn, Alan Mattingly, Lord Norrie, Adrian Phillips, Fiona Reynolds, Dei Tomos, Lord Walpole, and Iolo Williams and three Honorary Life Vice Presidents: Brian Blessed, Chris Bonington and Libby Purves.

External links
Campaign for National Parks home page

National parks of England and Wales
Nature conservation organisations based in the United Kingdom